Andrew Blair Tuke  (born 25 July 1989) is a New Zealand sailor who won the 2021 Americas Cup Held in Auckland and also won the 2017 Version held in Bermuda. He also won the gold medal at the 2016 Summer Olympics, and the silver medal at the 2012 Summer Olympics in the 49er class alongside Peter Burling.

He is a founder of Live Ocean - a registered New Zealand charity which supports and invests in promising marine science, innovation, technology and marine conservation projects. www.liveocean.com

Tuke with Burling was co-captain of the New Zealand team at the 2016 Olympics.  They are just the 4th New Zealand flagbearers to win a gold medal at the same Olympics.

Burling and Tuke won the 2016 Olympics with two races to spare and by an overall 43 point margin – winning by the most points of any sailing class in the Olympics since 1968 (when the modern scoring system started). They finished ahead of the second placed (Australian) boat in 11 of the 13 races, being behind by just three points in race 3 and one point in race 10.

Tuke and Burling won Silver at the 2021 Tokyo Olympics , missing the gold medal on countback.

Burling and Tuke were named New Zealand sports Team of the Year at the Halberg Awards in Feb 2017.

At the 2012 London Olympics, Burling and Tuke were the youngest team. Their silver medal was New Zealand's 100th Olympic medal.

Tuke and Burling are the first sailors to win six 49er class World Championships (2013, 2014, 2015, 2016, 2019 and 2020).
They  won all 28 of the major regattas in the 49er between the London Olympics (2012) and the Rio Olympics (2016). The only 49er regatta they did not win in the four-year period was third place at a short training regatta in July 2016. In 2013, Tuke was a member of the New Zealand team which won the inaugural Red Bull Youth America's Cup.

In November 2015 the International Sailing Federation announced that Tuke and Burling were the ISAF Rolex World Male Sailors of the year.

Burling and Tuke were named as Members of the New Zealand Order of Merit for services to sailing in the New Years Honours 2017.

Tuke is a member of Emirates Team New Zealand that have won the 35th America's Cup and recently the 36th America's Cup . He  sailed on Mapfre, finishing second in the 2017–18 Volvo Ocean Race.

Together with Peter Burling, he is joint CEO of the New Zealand SailGP team.

Personal life
Tuke attended Riverview Primary School and then Kerikeri High School before going to St Kentigern College in Pakuranga, Auckland. He learned to sail at the Kerikeri High School sailing academy, and the Kerikeri Cruising Club of which he is still a member.
Tuke is a qualified electrician.

Career 
Tuke and Burling won the 49er world championships in
2013, 2014, 2015, 2016, 2019 and 2020, and the 49er European championships in 2013, 2014, 2015, 2016 and 2019. They  won all 28 of the major regattas in the 49er between the London Olympics (2012) and the Rio Olympics (2016) (a record for this Olympic class).

Tuke and Burling were awarded the ISAF World Male Sailor of the Year for 2015.

Tuke was a key member of the Emirates Team New Zealand sailing team which won the America's Cup in Bermuda in 2017 and in Auckland in 2021.

America's Cup
 2017 – 35th America's Cup – Emirates Team New Zealand (foils controller)
 2021 – 36th America's Cup – Emirates Team New Zealand (foils controller)

Olympic Games 
 2021 – 49er class with Peter Burling
 2016 – 49er class with Peter Burling 
 2012 – 49er class with Peter Burling

World Championship titles
 2020 – 49er World Champion  – Geelong, Australia (with Peter Burling)
 2019 – 49er World Champion  – Auckland, New Zealand (with Peter Burling)
 2016 – 49er World Champion  – Clearwater, Florida, USA (with Peter Burling)
 2015 – 49er World Champion  – Buenos Aires, Argentina (with Peter Burling)
 2014 – 49er World Champion  – Santander, Spain (with Peter Burling)
 2013 – 49er World Champion Marseille, France (with Peter Burling)
 2009 – 29er World Champion (with Stephen Thomas, Aus)
 2006 – Splash World Champion

Other World Championship results
3rd – 2018 – 3rd A class catamaran World Championships – Hervey Bay, Australia
2nd – 2014 – 2nd A class catamaran World Championships – Auckland, New Zealand
2nd – 2012 – 2nd 49er World Championships – Croatia (with Peter Burling)
2nd – 2011 – 2nd 49er World Championships – Perth, Australia (with Peter Burling)
2nd – 2007  Volvo Youth ISAF World Championships – 29er Class
6th – 2015 – Moth World Championships – (Australia)
8th – 2013 – A Class World Championships – (USA)
8th – 2007 420 World Championships (Auckland)
9th – 2008 – 29er World Championships
17th – 2010 – 49er World Championships – Bahamas (with Peter Burling)
26th – 2009 – 49er World Championships – Lake Garda, Italy (with Peter Burling)
26th – 2008 – Tornado World Championships

Other achievements 
2013, 2014, 2015 and 2016 Unbeaten in major 49er regattas worldwide (27 49er regatta victories since London Olympics).

2020 49er regattas:-
2020   – 49er World Championships  – Geelong, Australia with Peter Burling)

2020  2nd 49er Oceanias (sailing with Peter Burling)

2019 49er regattas:-
2019   – 49er World Championships  – Auckland, New Zealand with Peter Burling)

2019  3rd 49er Oceanias (sailing with Peter Burling)

2019 7th Princessa Sofia Regatta (sailing with Peter Burling)

2019  3rd World Cup Regatta Genoa (sailing with Peter Burling)

2019  1st 49er Europeans (sailing with Peter Burling)

2019  1st 49er Olympic test event (sailing with Peter Burling)

2017
2017  1st Swan River Match Cup (Perth) – sailing with Peter Burling, Glenn Ashby and Josh Junior.

2016 49er regattas
2016 1st 49er 2016 Olympics with Peter Burling 

2016  3rd 49er Rio de Janeiro International Sailing week

2016  1st 49er Kieler Woche regatta, Germany (with Peter Burling)

2016  1st 49er Sailing World Cup Hyeres regatta, France (with Peter Burling)

2016  1st 49er European Championships – Barcelona, Spain (with Peter Burling)

2016  1st 49er World Championships  – Clearwater, Florida, USA (with Peter Burling)

2016  1st 49er NZL Nationals (with Peter Burling)

2016 America's Cup World series regattas
Crewing for Emirates Team New Zealand

2016  1st America's Cup World Series regatta, New York

2016  3rd America's Cup World Series regatta, Oman

2016 4th America's Cup World Series regatta, Chicago

2016 5th Americas Cup World Series regatta, Toulon, France

2015 49er regattas
2015  1st 49er World Champs, Buenos Aires (with Peter Burling)

2015  1st 49er South American Champs, Buenos Aires (with Peter Burling)(Nov 2015)

2015  1st 49er Olympic Test Event, Rio de Janeiro (with Peter Burling)(Aug 2015)

2015  1st 49er Rio de Janeiro International sailing week (with Peter Burling)(Aug 2015)

2015  1st 49er Europeans (Porto, Portugal) (with Peter Burling)

2015  1st 49er ISAF Sailing World Cup Weymouth regatta (Weymouth, England) (with Peter Burling)

2015  1st 49er ISAF Sailing World Cup Hyeres regatta (Hyeres, France) (with Peter Burling)

2015  1st 49er Princess Sofia Regatta (Palma, Mallorca) (with Peter Burling)

2015  1st 49er Sail Auckland (with Peter Burling)

2015  1st 49er NZL Nationals (with Peter Burling)

2015 America's Cup World Series regattas
Crewing for Emirates Team New Zealand – overall leader of 2015 America's Cup World Series

2015  2nd America's Cup World Series Bermuda (Oct 2015)

2015  1st America's Cup World Series Gothenburg (Aug 2015)

2015  2nd America's Cup World Series Portsmouth

2014 
2014  1st 49er Intergalactic Championships, Rio de Janeiro (with Peter Burling)

2014  1st 49er South American Championships, Rio de Janeiro (with Peter Burling)

2014  1st 49er Rio International Regatta, Rio de Janeiro (with Peter Burling)

2014  1st 49er European Championships, Helsinki (with Peter Burling)

2014  1st 49er Hyeres World cup regatta (with Peter Burling)

2014  1st 49er Mallorca World cup regatta (with Peter Burling)

2013 and previous 
2013  1st – Red Bull Youth America's Cup (Tactician for NZL sailing team)

2013  1st 49er European Championships (Aarhus, Denmark) (with Peter Burling)

2013  1st 49er Sail Auckland (with Peter Burling)

2010  1st 49er North American Championships (with Peter Burling)

2009 Completed 120 nm Coastal Classic course in 49er (Auckland to Russell) with Peter Burling

2009  New Zealand National Youth Matchracing Champion (with Peter Burling and Scott Burling)
2006 wins world championship splash

Awards 
 Member of the New Zealand Order of Merit for services to sailing, 2017 New Year Honours.
 Finalist, Rolex World Sailor of the Year 2016 (with Peter Burling)
ISAF Rolex World Male Sailor of the year 2015 (with Peter Burling)
Lonsdale Cup (NZOC) 2020 (with Peter Burling) "for a New Zealand athlete (or team) who has demonstrated the most outstanding contribution to an Olympic or Commonwealth sport during the previous year."
 Finalist, Rolex World Sailor of the Year 2014 (with Peter Burling)
Yachting New Zealand Sailor of the Year 2013, 2014, 2015, 2016   (with Peter Burling)
Finalist Halberg awards (New Zealand), Team of the Year (with Peter Burling) 2012, 2013, 2014, 2015, 2016.
Winner, Far North District Council Supreme Sports Award 2009-10-11-12-13-14-15-16-17, Top Energy Far North Sportsman of the Year 2016-17 and ASB Code Sailing Award 2016-17.
Halberg Sports Team of the Year 2016. (with Peter Burling)

References

External links
 
 
 
 

1989 births
Living people
People from Kerikeri
ISAF World Sailor of the Year (male)
New Zealand male sailors (sport)
Olympic gold medalists for New Zealand in sailing
Olympic silver medalists for New Zealand
Sailors at the 2012 Summer Olympics – 49er
Sailors at the 2016 Summer Olympics – 49er
Sailors at the 2020 Summer Olympics – 49er
Medalists at the 2012 Summer Olympics
Medalists at the 2016 Summer Olympics
Medalists at the 2020 Summer Olympics
People educated at Kerikeri High School
People educated at Saint Kentigern College
Extreme Sailing Series sailors
49er class world champions
29er class world champions
New Zealand sportsmen
Members of the New Zealand Order of Merit
Team New Zealand sailors
2017 America's Cup sailors
2021 America's Cup sailors
Volvo Ocean Race sailors
World champions in sailing for New Zealand